Hisonotus paulinus is a species of catfish in the family Loricariidae. It is native to South America, where it occurs in the Tietê River basin. The species reaches 4 cm (1.6 inches) SL.

References 

Fish described in 1908
Otothyrinae
Freshwater fish of South America